Matthäus Merian der Ältere (or "Matthew", "the Elder", or "Sr."; 22 September 1593 – 19 June 1650) was a Swiss-born engraver who worked in Frankfurt for most of his career, where he also ran a publishing house. He was a member of the patrician Basel Merian family.

Biography

Early life and marriage
Born in Basel, Merian learned the art of copperplate engraving in Zürich.  He next worked and studied in Strasbourg, Nancy, and Paris, before returning to Basel in 1615. The following year he moved to Oppenheim, Germany where he worked for the publisher Johann Theodor de Bry, who was the son of renowned engraver and traveler Theodor de Bry.

In 1617, Merian married Maria Magdalena de Bry, daughter of the publisher, and was for a time associated with the de Bry publishing house. In 1620, when Oppenheim was destroyed by fire during the Spanish occupation, they moved back to Basel, but three years later returned to Germany, this time to Frankfurt. They had four daughters and three sons, including Matthäus Merian the Younger. Maria Magdalena de Bry died in 1645 and the following year Matthäus married Johanna Sibylla Heim. Five years later, Matthäus died, leaving his wife with two small children, Anna Maria Sibylla Merian (born 1647), who later became a pioneering naturalist and illustrator, and a son, Maximilian, who died before his third birthday.

Later career
In 1623 Merian took over the publishing house of his father-in-law after de Bry's death.  In 1626 he became a citizen of Frankfurt and could henceforth work as an independent publisher.  He spent most of his working life in Frankfurt.

Early in his life, he had created detailed town plans in his unique style, e.g. a plan of Basel (1615) and a plan of Paris (1615). With Martin Zeiler (1589–1661), a German geographer, and later (circa 1640) with his own son, Matthäus Merian (der Jüngere, i.e. "the Younger" or "Jr.") (1621–1687), he produced a series of Topographia.  The 21-volume set was collectively known as the Topographia Germaniae. It includes numerous town plans and views, as well as maps of most countries and a World Map—it was such a popular work that it was re-issued in many editions. He also took over and completed the later parts and editions of the Grand Voyages and Petits Voyages, originally started by de Bry in 1590 and included volumes India Orientalis and America Occidentalis.

Merian's work inspired the Suecia Antiqua et Hodierna by Erik Dahlberg. The German travel magazine Merian is named after him.

He was also noted for the finesse of his alchemical illustrations, in books such as the Musaeum Hermeticum (1678) and Atalanta Fugiens (1618). He undertook the engravings for the encyclopaedic work of insect natural history De Serpentibus, compiled by John Jonston. This tradition would be taken up by his daughter.

Matthäus Merian died after several years of illness in 1650 in Langenschwalbach, near Wiesbaden.

After his death, his sons Matthäus Jr. and Caspar took over the publishing house.  They continued publishing the Topographia Germaniae and the Theatrum Europaeum under the name Merian Erben (i.e. Merian Heirs).

See also
 Topographia Galliae

References

Further reading

Lucas Heinrich Wüthrich: Das druckgraphische Werk von Matthäus Merian d.Ä.. vol.1 and 2: Basel 1966, vol.3 Hamburg 1993, vol.4: Hamburg 1996.
Catalog zu Ausstellungen im Museum für Kunsthandwerk Franckfurt am Mayn (15. September – 7. November 1993) und im Kunstmuseum Basel (27. November 1993 – 13. Februar 1994) als unsterblich Ehren-Gedächtnis zum 400. Geburtstag des hochberühmten Delineatoris (Zeichners), Incisoris (Stechers) et Editoris (Verlegers) Matthaeus Merian des Aelteren. Museum für Kunsthandwerk, Frankfurt am Main 1993, .
Ulrike Valeria Fuss: Matthaeus Merian der Ältere. Von der lieblichen Landschaft zum Kriegsschauplatz – Landschaft als Kulisse des 30jährigen Krieges. Frankfurt am Main, 2000, .
Jörg Diefenbacher: Die Schwalbacher Reise. Mannheim 2002, .
Ulrike Valeria Fuss: Momentaufnahme und Monumentalansicht. Ein Vergleich zwischen Valentin Wagner und Matthäus Merian d. Ä. In: Valentin Wagner (um 1610–1655): Ein Zeichner im Dreißigjährigen Krieg. Aufsätze und Werkkatalog. Darmstadt 2003, .
Lucas Heinrich Wüthrich: Matthaeus Merian d. Ä. Eine Biographie. Hoffmann und Campe, Hamburg 2007 (Lizenzausgabe: Wissenschaftliche Buchgesellschaft, Darmstadt 2007)
Götz J. Pfeiffer: Bild-Zeitung und Moral-Büchlein - der Dreissigjährige Krieg in Druckgraphiken von Matthäus Merian und Abraham Hogenberg, Jacques Callot und Hans Ulrich Franck, in: Der Dreissigjährige Krieg in Hanau und Umgebung, hrsg. vom Hanauer Geschichtsverein, Hanau, 2011, pp. 255–275.

External links

 Pictures and texts of Topographia Helvetiae, Rhaetiae et Valesiae by Matthäus Merian can be found in the database VIATIMAGES.
 Works by Matthäus Merian, Museum of New Zealand Te Papa Tongarewa
 America noviter delineata, 1633 map by Matthäus Merian, Portal to Texas History, University of Texas
 Merian maps and engravings

1593 births
1650 deaths
17th-century engravers
Artists from Basel-Stadt
Swiss engravers
Swiss cartographers
Baroque printmakers
17th-century Swiss people
17th-century cartographers
Matthaus
Burials at St Peter's Cemetery, Frankfurt